Erbessa evippoides is a moth of the family Notodontidae first described by Hering in 1925. It is found in Colombia and Ecuador.

References

Moths described in 1925
Notodontidae of South America